Nevşehir is a city and the capital district of Nevşehir Province in the Central Anatolia Region of Turkey. According to the 2020 census, the population of the city is 82,110.

Although Nevşehir is close to the underground cities, fairy chimneys, monasteries, caravanserais and rock-hewn churches of Cappadocia, and has a few hotels, the modern town is not itself a tourist centre. In 2015 a huge underground city was discovered underneath its centre following demolition works intended to clear the central hillside of ramshackle modern housing.

Founded in 2007, Nevşehir University was renamed Nevşehir Hacı Bektaş Veli University in 2013.

Nevşehir Kapadokya Airport (NAV) is 30 kilometres northwest of the town.The inter-city bus station is about 6 km southwest of the city centre. Two planned high-speed rail services should eventually link Nevşehir to Antalya, Konya, Kayseri and Ankara.

History

Prehistory and ancient history 
The Hittites first founded the settlement of Nissa on the slopes of Mount Kahveci in the valley of Kızılırmak (the ancient Halys). This town, along with the region, came under the rule of the Assyrian Empire around the 8th century BC, and was subsequently ruled by the Medes and then by the Persians during the reign of emperor Cyrus the Great in 546 BC. In 333 BC, Alexander the Great defeated the Persians and after his death, the surrounding area came under the rule of the dynasty of Ariarathes with Mazaka (present-day Kayseri) as its capital. The Cappadocian kingdom became a  province- of the Roman empire in the reign of Emperor Tiberius.

Medieval history 
The so-called underground cities found around Nevşehir  may originally have been built to escape persecution by the pagan Roman authorities although others believe they date back to Hittite times. Many of the churches, hewn in the rocks, date from these early years of Christianity. Even when Theodosius I made Christianity the official religion of the empire, the caves offered protection for the local people during raids by the Sassanid Persians circa AD 604 and by the Islamic Caliphate from AD 647 onwards. When Iconoclasm became state policy in the Byzantine empire, again the caves around Nevşehir became shelters for those escaping persecution.

The castle on the hill in the middle of Nevşehir dates from the Byzantine period, when the region was on the frontline in the (holy) wars against the Islamic Caliphate.

At the Battle of Manzikert (present-day Malazgirt) in AD 1071, the Byzantine emperor Romanos IV was defeated by the Seljuk Sultan Alp Arslan which led to the occupation of Anatolia by the Seljuks by 1074. Along with the rest of the region, Nevşehir became part of the Seljuk Sultanate of Rum, then fell under the rule of the Karamanid dynasty in 1328 and finally under Ottoman rule around 1487 AD when it was renamed Muşkara. It remained relatively insignificant until the early 18th century.

Modern history 

The present-day city owes its foundation in the so-called Tulip Age to the grand vizier and son-in-law of the Sultan Ahmed III, Nevşehirli Damad İbrahim Pasha who was born in Muşkara and later took a great interest in its expansion. The small village with only 18 houses, formerly under the administration of the kaza of Ürgüp, was rapidly transformed with the building of mosques (the Kurṣunlu Mosque), fountains, schools, soup kitchens, inns and bath houses, and its name was changed from Muşkara to "Nevşehir" (meaning New City in Persian and Ottoman Turkish). In 1730 the grand vizier was assassinated by rebels in İstanbul but by then Nevşehir was firmly established as a town.
The present-day city owes its foundation in the so-called Tulip Age to the grand vizier and son-in-law of the Sultan Ahmed III, Nevşehirli Damad İbrahim Pasha who was born in Muşkara and later took a great interest in its expansion. The small village with only 18 houses, formerly under the administration of the kaza of Ürgüp, was rapidly transformed with the building of mosques (the [[:c:|Kurṣunlu Mosque), fountains, schools, soup kitchens, inns and bath houses, and its name was changed from Muşkara to "Nevşehir" (meaning New City in Persian and Ottoman Turkish). In 1730 the grand vizier was assassinated by rebels in İstanbul but by then Nevşehir was firmly established as a town.

According to the Ottoman General Census of 1881/82-1893, the kaza of Nevşehir had a total population of 39,822, consisting of 30,370 Muslims, 8,918 Greeks, 477 Armenians, 36 Catholics and 21 Protestants.

Under the terms of the Convention Concerning the Exchange of Greek and Turkish Populations in 1923, the Turkish speaking Greek Orthodox community (Karamanlis) of Nevşehir was exchanged for Muslims from Osheni, Shak and Revani villages of Kesriye (today's Οινόη, Κομνηνάδες and Διποταμία villages of Kastoria, Western Macedonia, Greece).

Economy 
The economy of Nevşehir is largely characterized by agriculture as well as tourism.

Sightseeing

In town 

Kurşunlu Mosque, a unique early 17th-century mosque in the city centre which contains elements of Ottoman and Tulip period architecture. 

 Nevşehir Castle and Kayaşehir

 Meryem Ana Kilisesi, Mother Mary Church near Nevşehir Castle

 The Hagios Georgios Church, also known as the 'Çanlı Church' near Nevşehir Castle

 Green Valley - dotted with restaurants and gardens near Nar

 Nevşehir Veterans Stadium

 Nevşehir Football Stadium

Around town 

 Uçhisar, a rock-cut castle in Cappadocia. 

 Churches of Göreme

Gallery

Climate
Nevşehir has a continental climate (Köppen climate classification: Dsa, Trewartha climate classification: Dc), with cold, snowy winters and warm, dry summers. Precipitation occurs throughout the year, with a slight peak in spring.

Notable people
 

Filippos Aristovoulos (1832–1903), Ottoman Greek scholar and Caloyer

Notes

References

Activities in Nevşehir

External links 

 Nevşehir Travel governor's official website 
 Nevşehir governor's official website 
 Map of Nevşehir district
 Nevşehir municipality's official website 
 Nevşehir 
 Some 200 pictures of the town and its sights
 Administrative map of Nevşehir district  

 
Cities in Turkey
Districts of Nevşehir Province
Populated places in Nevşehir Province
Archaeological sites in Central Anatolia
Roman sites in Turkey
Cappadocia